Lamprodila festiva is a species of metallic wood-boring beetle in the family Buprestidae. It is found in Europe.

References 

Buprestidae
Beetles described in 1767
Taxa named by Carl Linnaeus